The Royal Netherlands Sea Rescue Institution (Dutch: Koninklijke Nederlandse Redding Maatschappij, abbreviated: KNRM) is the voluntary organization in the Netherlands tasked with saving lives at sea. For that purpose, it maintains 45 lifeboat stations along the Dutch coast of the North Sea and Wadden Sea and on the IJsselmeer. It maintains 78 boats ranging from small boat to 21 meter long RHIBs. It also provides lifeguard services at some beaches on the Frisian Islands in the Waddensea, and the beach of Wassenaar. Its headquarters have been in IJmuiden since 1996.

The KNRM was created May 22, 1991 by merging the Koninklijke Noord- en Zuid-Hollandsche Redding-Maatschappij (founded November 11, 1824), called the Noord (North), and the Koninklijke Zuid-Hollandsche Maatschappij tot Redding van Schipbreukelingen (founded November 20, 1824), called the Zuid (South). Between 1824 and 2006, they answered 36358 distress calls and saved 79887 people out of distress situations.
Yearly they have about 1700 distress calls with about 3500 people saved (2008).

The KNRM also operates the Dutch Radio Medical Service (a task taken over from the Netherlands Red Cross on January 1, 1999) and provides  medical advice by radio to about 900 ships each year.

Like the comparable Royal National Lifeboat Institution, which operates in the UK and Ireland, and the German Maritime Search and Rescue Service, the KNRM is entirely financed by private donations.

Famous lifeboat-saviors 

 Henry Freeman
 Dorus Rijkers
 Grace Darling
 Henry Blogg

Famous rescues 

 Rescue of the Renown

See also 
Similar organizations in other countries:
Europe
 Royal National Lifeboat Institution (Ireland and the United Kingdom)
 Société Nationale de Sauvetage en Mer (France)
 German Maritime Search and Rescue Service (Germany)
 Norsk Selskab til Skibbrudnes Redning (Norway, also called Redningsselskapet)

Elsewhere
 International Life Saving Federation
 Whitfords Volunteer Sea Rescue Group - One of the 2 last independent charitable lifeboat stations left in Western Australia, the rest are government co-ordinated. There is no state or nationwide equivalent of KNRM or RNLI.

External links 

 Official site (Dutch)
 Official site (English)
 Locations Lifeboat Stations KNRM in Google Earth

Sea rescue organizations
Transport in the Netherlands
Organisations based in North Holland
Organisations based in the Netherlands with royal patronage
Velsen
1991 establishments in the Netherlands
Organizations established in 1991